Ejaz Lakdawala is one of the most wanted gangsters from Mumbai, Maharashtra,  India. 

In May 2003, he was rumoured to have been killed when Dawood's gang-members, also known as D-Company, angered by his allegiance to Chota Rajan, opened fire at him in a crowded market in Bangkok. However, he survived and moved to Canada.

In May 2004, he was arrested by the Royal Canadian Mounted Police in Ottawa, Ontario, Canada following an Interpol red corner notice for him.

In the early morning of 9 January 2020 he was arrested by Mumbai Police. His arrest comes on the heels of his daughter Sonia Lakdawala alias Sonia Shaikh's arrest a fortnight ago at Mumbai International Airport, while she was trying to fly to Nepal on a forged passport. Ejaz is involved in more than 20 cases of extortion, attempted murder and rioting.

References

External links
Gangster Ejaz Lakdawala held in Canada news article in Times of India dated 20 May 2004

Indian gangsters
Indian extortionists
Living people
Indian Muslims
Criminals from Mumbai
Year of birth missing (living people)